Tower of Myraglen is an adventure role-playing video game published by PBI Software.  It was released for the Apple IIGS in 1987.

Plot
The player character is a Knight of Justice sent by the King of Myraglen to retrieve the Medallion of Soul Stealing from the Tower of Myraglen.

Reception
The game was reviewed in 1988 in Dragon #129 by Hartley, Patricia, and Kirk Lesser in "The Role of Computers" column. The reviewers gave the game 3½ stars.

References

External links
Review in Family Computing
Review in InCider

1987 video games
Apple IIGS games
Apple IIGS-only games
PBI Software games
Role-playing video games
Single-player video games
Video games developed in the United States